Niels Friis (died 1508) was a Roman Catholic prelate who served as Bishop of Viborg (1498–1508).

Biography
On 4 December 1498, Niels Friis was appointed during the papacy of Pope Alexander VI as Bishop of Viborg. He served as Bishop of Viborg until his death in 1508.

References 

15th-century Roman Catholic bishops in Denmark
16th-century Roman Catholic bishops in Denmark
Bishops appointed by Pope Alexander VI
1508 deaths